Mark Arminski is an American rock concert poster artist born in 1950 in Detroit, Michigan. He began studying art at the Oakland Community College and pursued printmaking in stone lithography at the Kalamazoo Institute of Arts. Rounding out his formal education was his stay at the Dynamic Graphics Education Foundation in Peoria, Illinois, where he studied computer generated art.

Considered a leader in the new school of rock 'n' roll posters, Mark Arminski has painted the landscape of Detroit and beyond with his signature pieces of concert art. His first commissioned poster work was in the form of silk screens for Iggy Pop and the Smashing Pumpkins. Arminski is notable for bridging the gap between the psychedelic art of the 1960s and the grunge aesthetic of the early 1990s, and he has emerged as a genuine equal among his own mentors. While much of his work was originally found in and around Michigan, he has designed concert posters for events in New York, Los Angeles, and San Francisco, and he is regularly commissioned to design CD cover art. Arminski continues to have great influence among poster artists and his rich eye-popping designs have expanded beyond print media to body art and murals.

Arminski is the official artist of the Mackinac Island Music Festival, making a new work each season to showcase local, regional and national musicians with deep ties to Michigan.

Rob Maniscalco, portrait artist and producer of Detroit Public TV show Art Beat, who has interviewed Mark Arminski on his show, wrote the following words of introduction: Named "Artist of the Year" by Visions magazine, Arminski is not limited to poster art and CD covers; he is a master muralist, fine artist and body painter.

Arminski is also featured in the book Art of Modern Rock: The Poster Explosion, the first and last word on the finest rock concert posters of the past fifteen years, a period of unprecedented explosion in poster-making activity for both the biggest names in rock as well as the most highly regarded new rock acts. This comprehensive work includes posters from rock's greatest bands and the most exciting new bands.

He was sued by the bands Phish and the Dave Matthews Band over claims that he sold copies of posters produced for the two bands. The lawsuits were reported in several newspapers.

“I’m one of those individuals who tends to view everything with artistic merit.” —Arminski

References
 
 
 Movement 2009 Limited Edition Prints Available Now!!
 Mark Arminiski featured on Art Beat
 San Francisco Chronicle (January 23, 1998): David vs. Goliath, The Rock Version - Modest poster artist sued by giant pop acts
 Metro Times, January 7, 1998: Ill-suited art - Artists fear that a court case could be the end of the rock poster as we know it.
 Mark Arminski displays his rock poster oeuvre online: Mark Arminski Collection
 River's Edge Gallery: Mark Arminski

American poster artists
Artists from Michigan
1950 births
Living people